18th Visual Effects Society Awards
January 29, 2020

Outstanding Visual Effects in a Photoreal Feature:
The Lion King

Outstanding Visual Effects in a Photoreal Episode:
The Mandalorian – The Child

The 18th Visual Effects Society Awards was an awards ceremony held by the Visual Effects Society. Nominations were announced on January 7, 2020, and the ceremony took place on January 29, 2020.

Nominees

Honorary Awards
Lifetime Achievement Award:
Martin Scorsese

VES Visionary Award:
Roland Emmerich

VES Award for Creative Excellence
Sheena Duggal

Film

Television

Other categories

Most nominations

References

External links
 Visual Effects Society

2020
2020 film awards
2020 television awards